The 2012 Men's Hockey Champions Trophy was the 34th edition of the Hockey Champions Trophy men's field hockey tournament. The tournament was held between 1–9 December 2012 in Melbourne, Australia.

Australia won the tournament for the thirteenth time after defeating the Netherlands 2–1 in the final, extending their record winning streak to five consecutive titles.

Teams
Even though Spain was automatically qualified as the runner-up of the previous edition, they withdrew from participating due to financial issues. In addition to the three teams nominated by the FIH Executive Board to compete, the following eight teams, competed in this tournament.

 (Host nation and defending champions)
 (Third in 2011 Champions Trophy)
 (Fourth in 2011 Champions Trophy)
 (Fifth in 2011 Champions Trophy)
 (Winner of 2011 Champions Challenge I)
 (Nominated by FIH Executive Board)
 (Nominated by FIH Executive Board)
 (Nominated by FIH Executive Board)

Umpires
Below are the 10 umpires appointed by the International Hockey Federation:

Richmond Attipoe (GHA)
Diego Barbas (ARG)
David Gentles (AUS)
Andrew Kennedy (ENG)
Martin Madden (SCO)
Deon Nel (RSA)
Raghu Prasad (IND)
Haider Rasool (PAK)
Simon Taylor (NZL)
Paco Vázquez (ESP)

Results
All times are Australia Eastern Daylight Time (UTC+11)

First round

Pool A

Pool B

Second round

Quarterfinals

Fifth to eighth place classification

Crossover

Seventh and eighth place

Fifth and sixth place

First to fourth place classification

Semi-finals

Third and fourth place

Final

Awards

Statistics

Final standings

Goalscorers

References

External links
Official FIH website

Champions Trophy (field hockey)
Champions Trophy
2012
December 2012 sports events in Australia